The 1919–20 Southern Branch Cubs men's basketball team represented the Southern Branch of the University of California during the 1919–20 NCAA men's basketball season and were members of the Southern California Intercollegiate Athletic Conference This was the program's first season and they were coached by Fred Cozens who also coached the football team and served as athletic director. As the southern branch did not offer third year and fourth year coursework until 1924, the roster consisted of first and second year students. In their inaugural season, cubs finished with an overall record of 12–2 and were second in their conference with a record of 8–2.

Previous season
Although the Southern Branch's predecessor, the Los Angeles State Normal School, sponsored a men's basketball team, the UCLA recordbooks do not recognize these seasons.

Roster

Schedule

|-
!colspan=9 style=|Regular Season

Source

Notes

References

UCLA Bruins men's basketball seasons
Southern Branch Cubs Basketball
Southern Branch Cubs Basketball
Southern Branch